Pasvalio Vienkiemiai is a village in Panevėžys County, in northeastern Lithuania. According to the 2021 census, the village had a population of 27 inhabitants.

History
On 13 January 2023, an explosion occurred at the Lithuania–Latvia Interconnection pipeline system within the territory of the village. As a precaution, the entire nearby village of Valakėliai was evacuated.

Demography

Transport
KK150 national road goes through the village with connections to Šiauliai, Pakruojis and Pasvalys.

References

Villages in Panevėžys County
Pasvalys District Municipality